Steven Thomas Knox (born 16 February 1974 in Barrow-in-Furness, Lancashire) is a former first-class cricketer who played for Scotland.

Knox was a right-handed opening batsman, Knox was born in England but completed his seven years qualification to become a Scottish national. Knox is current coach of Scotland women's national cricket team and played for the Heriots Cricket Club first team as an opening batsman.

In 2002 he scored four consecutive centuries, all unbeaten, three of them for Cumberland in minor counties matches, and the other for Penicuik in Scotland division two.

In January 2014, Knox was appointed head coach of the German national cricket team. He also coached the new Reivers franchise in the 2014 season of the North Sea Pro Series.

In 2016, Knox was named as head of the Scotland women's national cricket team taking over from Kari Carswell will start his coaching journey towards the qualification of 2017 ICC Women's World Cup.

References

External links
Cricinfo

1974 births
Living people
Scottish cricketers
Cumberland cricketers
Cumberland cricket captains
Sportspeople from Barrow-in-Furness
Cricketers from Cumbria
Scottish cricket coaches
Scottish expatriate sportspeople in Germany